The Northern Ireland national football team represents Northern Ireland in international association football. From 1882 to 1921 all of Ireland was represented by a single side, the Ireland national football team, organised by the Irish Football Association (IFA). 

In 1920 Ireland was partitioned into Northern Ireland and Southern Ireland. In 1922, The south of Ireland gained independence as the Irish Free State, later to become Republic of Ireland. Amid these political upheavals, a rival football association, the Football Association of Ireland (the F.A.I.), emerged in Dublin in 1921 and organised a separate league and later a national team. In 1923, during a period when the home nations had dis-affiliated from the governing body, the FAI was recognised by FIFA as the governing body of the Irish Free State on the condition that it changed its name to the Football Association of the Irish Free State. At the same time, the IFA continued to organise its national team on an all-Ireland basis, regularly calling up Free State players. During this era at least one Northerner, Harry Chatton, also played for the Irish Free State and from 1936, the FAI began to organise their own all–Ireland team. Both teams now competed as Ireland and during this era at least 39 dual internationals were selected to represent both teams.
Between 1928 and 1946 the IFA were not affiliated to FIFA and the two Ireland teams co-existed, never competing in the same competition.

In April 1951, FIFA decreed that the IFA team could not select "citizens of Eire". An exception was for British Home Championship games, as a 1923 IFAB agreement at Liverpool prevented FIFA intervention in relations between the four Home Nations. However, the exception would only apply "if the F.A. of Ireland do not object", and was never availed of.

At FIFA's 1953 congress, its Rule 3 was amended so that an international team must use "that title ... recognised politically and geographically of the countries or territories". The FAI initially claimed Rule 3 gave them the right to the name Ireland (see names of the Irish state), but FIFA subsequently ruled neither team could be referred to as Ireland, decreeing that the FAI team be officially designated as the Republic of Ireland, while the IFA team was to become Northern Ireland. The IFA objected and in 1954 was permitted to continue using the name Ireland in Home Internationals, based on the 1923 agreement. This practice was discontinued in the late 1970s.

This is a list of the Ireland national football team results from 1900 to 1929.

1900s

1900

1901

1902

1903

1904

1905

1906

1907

1908

1909

1910s

1910

1911

1912

1913

1914

1919

1920s

1920

1921

1922

1923

1924

1925

1926

1927

1928

1929

Notes

References

External links
RSSSF: (Northern) Ireland - International Results
British Home Championships 1900-1914
British Home Championships 1920-1939
Northern Ireland Football Greats Archive
Northern Ireland Statistics and Records
England International Database From 1872
England Football Online
Scotland International Archive
Scotland Football Records Complete Record
Welsh Football Data Archive

1900-29
1919–20 in Irish association football
1901–02 in Irish association football
1902–03 in Irish association football
1903–04 in Irish association football
1904–05 in Irish association football
1905–06 in Irish association football
1906–07 in Irish association football
1907–08 in Irish association football
1908–09 in Irish association football
1910–11 in Irish association football
1911–12 in Irish association football
1912–13 in Irish association football
1913–14 in Irish association football
1914–15 in Irish association football
1915–16 in Irish association football
1916–17 in Irish association football
1917–18 in Irish association football
1918–19 in Irish association football
1920–21 in Irish association football
1921–22 in Northern Ireland association football
1922–23 in Northern Ireland association football
1923–24 in Northern Ireland association football
1924–25 in Northern Ireland association football
1925–26 in Northern Ireland association football
1926–27 in Northern Ireland association football
1927–28 in Northern Ireland association football
1928–29 in Northern Ireland association football
1929–30 in Northern Ireland association football